The Perfect Wave is a 2014 biographical drama film about the life of Ian McCormack, a surfer who became a minister after his near death experience.  The film stars Scott Eastwood as McCormack.  It is the directorial debut of Bruce Macdonald.

Plot
A young Kiwi surfer named Ian is on his OE (overseas experience) in Mauritius, an island off the coast of Africa. While night diving with friends, he is stung by 5 deadly box jellyfish and takes a dramatic journey to hospital, helped and hindered by local people. He cries out to the God he barely remembers from childhood and meets him face to face, saying "you can't love me, I've cursed you, slept around, taken drugs and more". What happens after that is riveting and provides a beacon of hope, not just for Ian, but for everyone who has ever lived.

Cast
Scott Eastwood as Ian McCormack
Cheryl Ladd as Mrs. McCormack
Patrick Lyster as Mr. McCormack
Rachel Hendrix as Anabel
Scott Mortensen as Lachlan
Nikolai Mynhardt as Michael McCormack
Diana Vickers as Kim
Matt Bromley as Mark
Rosy Hodge as Roxy
Shaun Payne as Free Surfer
Jack Halloran as Greg

References

External links
 
 
 

2014 films
2014 biographical drama films
Indonesian biographical drama films
New Zealand biographical drama films
Films shot in New Zealand
Films shot in Sydney
South African biographical drama films
2014 directorial debut films
2014 drama films
Films scored by Jeremy Soule
2010s English-language films
English-language Indonesian films
English-language South African films